Aleksandr Sidorenko (born 8 January 1972) is a Belarusian wrestler. He competed in the men's Greco-Roman 90 kg at the 1996 Summer Olympics.

References

1972 births
Living people
Belarusian male sport wrestlers
Olympic wrestlers of Belarus
Wrestlers at the 1996 Summer Olympics
Sportspeople from Gomel